Judith Sidney Hornabrook (26 October 1928 – 3 July 2011) was the Chief Archivist of New Zealand at the Archives New Zealand from 1972 until 1982.

Career
After World War II, Hornabrook earned a position with the New Zealand government in the War History Branch. She then joined the National Archives of New Zealand as a reference archivist. In 1973, Hornabrook was named Chief Archivist of New Zealand at the Archives New Zealand. She left the Archives New Zealand in 1982 to become the Chief Archivist in Papua New Guinea.

Hornabrook published several works related to her professional knowledge and work in national archives.

Hornabrook died on 3 July 2011.

Selected bibliography

References

See also 

 Archives New Zealand
 National Archives of Papua New Guinea (en français)

1928 births
2011 deaths
Female archivists
21st-century New Zealand women
20th-century New Zealand women